Big Sandy may refer to:

Communities
Big Sandy, Montana, a town in Chouteau County
Big Sandy, Nebraska, in Thayer County, Nebraska
Big Sandy, Tennessee, a town in Benton County
Big Sandy, Texas, a town in Upshur County
Big Sandy, West Virginia, an unincorporated census-designated place in McDowell County
Big Sandy, Wyoming, in Sublette County, Wyoming

Other
Big Sandy & His Fly-Rite Boys, a California band
Big Sandy Regional Airport, located in southwest Martin County, Kentucky, United States
United States Penitentiary, Big Sandy, in Inez, Kentucky
The nickname of the main dirt track at Belmont Park in Elmont, New York

See also
Big Sandy Creek (disambiguation)
Big Sandy River (disambiguation)